Safire may refer to:

 Sa-Fire (born 1966), American vocalist
 Safire (illusionists), a British illusion act
 Safire Theatre complex, in Chennai, India
 William Safire (1929–2009), American journalist and speechwriter
 South African Identity Federation; see TENET (network)

See also
 Safir (disambiguation)
 Saphir (disambiguation)
 Sapphire (disambiguation)